The Portuguese word crioulo (crioula, crioulos, crioulas) may refer to:

 In Brazil, a person of African ancestry
 A creole language, especially one of the Portuguese-based creole languages
 Criollo horse, also known as a crioulo horse.
 Crioulo cattle, Brazilian Criollo cattle breeds

See also
 Creole (disambiguation)
 Criollo (disambiguation)